Orphan: First Kill is a 2022 psychological horror film directed by William Brent Bell, written by David Coggeshall, based on a story by David Leslie Johnson-McGoldrick and Alex Mace. It is a prequel to the 2009 film Orphan. It stars Isabelle Fuhrman, Julia Stiles, Rossif Sutherland, Hiro Kanagawa, and Matthew Finlan.

Originally with the working title of Esther, the project was announced in February 2020. The official title was revealed in November that same year, with Fuhrman reprising her role as Esther. Filming took place in Winnipeg, Canada, from November to December 2020.

Orphan: First Kill premiered first in other territories starting in the Philippines on July 27, 2022, and was released in the United States on August 19, by Paramount Pictures through the Paramount Players label in select theatres, digital, and streaming via Paramount+. The film has grossed $44 million worldwide and received mixed reviews from critics, who praised the film's twists, practical effects (in regard to de-aging Fuhrman without CGI) and Fuhrman's performance, but criticized its story and inconsistencies.

Plot
On January 26, 2007, Estonian psychiatric patient Leena Klammer, a 31-year-old woman with a rare hormonal disorder called hypopituitarism that gives her the appearance of a 9-year-old child, orchestrates an escape from the Saarne  by seducing and killing a guard and hiding in the car of Anna, an art therapist. After breaking into Anna's house and killing her, Leena looks up missing American girls and finds that she bears resemblance to a girl named Esther Albright, who went missing in 2003. Later, posing as a lost girl, Leena is approached by a Russian police officer and introduces herself as "Esther", claiming that her parents are in the United States.

In Darien, Connecticut, wealthy artist Allen Albright and his wife, philanthropist Tricia, who has since come to terms with the disappearance of their daughter, are informed by Detective Donnan that "Esther" has been found. Tricia travels to the U.S. embassy in Moscow where she is "reunited" with Esther. Tricia brings Esther home and immediately starts to have doubts when she notices that Esther has forgotten about the death of her grandmother or that her painting skills have increased enormously compared to before she disappeared. Leena grows fond of Allen after they both start bonding over their painting skills and tries to separate him from Tricia.

While Tricia and Allen attend a charity gala hosted by Tricia, Donnan arrives at the house and steals a vinyl record from Esther's room which has Leena's fingerprints on it. He takes it back to his house, unaware that Leena has followed him, and analyzes the fingerprints to find it is not a match. Leena attacks Donnan before Tricia arrives, having followed Leena. Surprisingly, Tricia shoots him dead. Tricia reveals that she knows Leena is not Esther, who died four years earlier during an altercation with Tricia's son Gunnar, which Tricia covered up without Allen's knowledge. Leena reveals her true identity to Tricia, and the two then dispose of Donnan's body in a cellar hatch where Esther was buried and frame his disappearance as a vacation trip by forging an email to the police station.

Knowing that it would be too suspicious if "Esther" were to disappear again, Tricia agrees to continue Leena's act for Allen's sake, and Leena and Tricia remain on guard with each other. Tricia eventually attempts to poison Leena during dinner, but Leena refuses to eat the food and excuses herself. Leena feeds the food to the rat that lives in her room and later finds the rodent dead from ingesting the poisoned meal. Leena retaliates by making a green smoothie mixed with the rodent's carcass for Tricia. Allen reveals he is going into the city to meet about a potential art gallery. At the train station, Leena attempts to kill Tricia and Gunnar by pushing them in front of a train, but her attempt is accidentally interrupted by a passing commuter. With Allen away, Leena tries fleeing by stealing Tricia's car, but she is soon found by a police officer.

That night, Leena is brought back to the Albright house and Tricia and Gunnar finally decide to kill Leena. Tricia tries to stage a suicide, but Leena fights back and flees before Gunnar throws her down the stairs. Distracted by a phone call from Allen, who is returning home, Tricia and Gunnar search for Leena when she disappears. Leena shoots Gunnar with a crossbow, then stabs him to death with his fencing sword. An enraged Tricia and Leena fight in the kitchen, inadvertently setting the house alight in the process and the pair flee to the roof as Allen returns home.

Tricia and Leena both slip and end up clinging to the roof, begging Allen to save them, with Leena claiming Tricia attacked her, and Tricia trying to reveal the truth about Leena. Unable to save both of them, Allen chooses to help "Esther", causing Tricia to lose her grip and fall to her death. Allen then checks Leena's face, which causes her fake teeth to fall out. Realizing she is not Esther, Leena tries to defend herself saying "she did it for them" and that she "loves Allen", only for Allen to call her a "monster". Enraged, she pushes him off the roof to his death. Leena then dresses herself as "Esther" and leaves the burning house after cleaning off the blood on her face.

Later, "Esther" is moved to an orphanage where she waits for a new family to adopt her.

Cast
 Isabelle Fuhrman as Esther / Leena
 Julia Stiles as Tricia Albright
 Rossif Sutherland as Allen Albright
 Hiro Kanagawa as Detective Donnan
 Matthew Finlan as Gunnar Albright
 Samantha Walkes as Dr. Segar
 Dave Brown as Dr. Novory
 Lauren Cochrane as Officer Leahy
 Gwendolyn Collins as Anna 
 Alec Carlos as Mike
 Jade Michael as Madison

Production

Development
In February 2020, a prequel to Orphan (2009) with the working title of Esther, was announced as being in development. An international co-production between The United States and Canada. William Brent Bell was hired as director, with a screenplay by David Coggeshall, from an original story co-written by David Leslie Johnson-McGoldrick and Alex Mace. The project was announced as a joint-venture production between eOne, Dark Castle Entertainment, Sierra/Affinity, and Eagle Vision. Johnson-McGoldrick also served as executive producer, while Alex Mace, Hal Sadoff, Ethan Erwin, and James Tomlinson were hired as producers. In November 2020, the film's official title was announced as Orphan: First Kill, with Isabelle Fuhrman reprising her role as Esther, and Julia Stiles and Rossif Sutherland joining the cast as co-stars.

Isabelle Fuhrman later revealed that she played a key role in the project's green light following a real-life adoption scandal. In 2014, Indiana couple Kristine and Michael Barnett were charged with child abandonment of their then-nine-year-old foster child with dwarfism, Natalia Grace, two years earlier by claiming her to secretly be an adult and by changing her legal age to 22. The case received widespread media attention in 2019 when the Barnetts confirmed they had been inspired to abandon Grace after watching Orphan. Fuhrman stated that she was contacted by a large number of people regarding its eerie similarities to Orphan. As this was going on, she stated that she contacted Johnson-McGoldrick regarding the potential for a follow-up film, to which he revealed that they had a prequel script written. The actress worked with the writer to further the development of the project, with the intent to serve as a producer with the potential to appear in a possible cameo role with a new actress portraying the title character, before the duo eventually elected to have Fuhrman reprise the role herself.

Filming
Principal photography began in Winnipeg in November 2020 and wrapped on December 11, of the same year. The production crew used a combination of makeup and forced perspective shots to allow Fuhrman to again portray Esther without use of CGI special effects. Two female child actors also served as body doubles for Fuhrman. Fuhrman additionally provided uncredited contributions to the script.

In September 2021, it was announced Paramount Pictures had acquired U.S. distribution rights through Paramount Players to the film, unlike the previous film, which was distributed by Warner Bros. Pictures. The film was distributed internationally by Sierra/Affinity, a label of Entertainment One.

Release
Orphan: First Kill was released simultaneously through limited theatrical release, video on demand, and on Paramount+, on August 19, 2022. It was believed at one point to have a release date of January 28, 2022, but this was deemed unofficial. It was first released in the Philippines on July 27, 2022.

Reception

Box office 
Orphan: First Kill grossed $5.4 million in the United States and Canada, and $38.6 million in other territories, for a worldwide total of $44 million.

The film made $670,000 from 478 theaters on its first day, and went on to debut to $1.7 million in its opening weekend.

Critical response 
On review aggregator Rotten Tomatoes, the film holds an approval rating of 72% based on 144 reviews, with an average rating of 6.1/10. The website's critic's consensus reads: "Leaning into its ludicrous premise, Orphan: First Kill is a sequel that holds its own—and for fans of campy horror, may even represent an improvement on the original." Metacritic gave the film a weighted average score of 54 out of 100, based on 27 critics, indicating "mixed or average reviews". 

In a positive review, Matt Donato from IGN gave 7 out of 10 and wrote: "Orphan: First Kill doubles down as a prequel about Esther but manages to feel so uniquely standalone thanks to some supreme storytelling swings." Richard Whittaker from The Austin Chronicle gave it 3 out of 5 stars, writing: "What makes Orphan: First Kill worthwhile is that it acknowledges the original before taking a hard left turn into overblown soapy madness. The modern gothic of the first film transforms here into a perfectly fitting explosion of operatic schlock." Lena Wilson from The Wrap also gave a positive review, writing: "First Kill takes the best part of its predecessor—its camp value—and dials things up to 11, delivering a movie that demands to be seen at rowdy theaters and sleepovers worldwide." Alyse Wax from Collider gave a B rating, writing: "First Kill is a smart, tight film that fits perfectly into what the first Orphan film set up over a decade ago." Courtney Howard from The A.V. Club gave a B+ rating and wrote: "Offering the winning combination of a subversive spin on a well-established villain, Orphan: First Kill is a gnarly, wild and absolutely demented ride."

In a mixed review, Leslie Felperin from The Guardian wrote: "The most disappointing thing about the film is that it has none of the spark or originality of the first one and just parasitically drains its source material, incorporating details like the creepy black-light drawings and the borderline paedophilic subtext without adding anything substantial." Clarisse Loughrey from The Independent also gave a mixed review, writing: "There’s a surprising amount to enjoy here, with director William Brent Bell (behind The Boy franchise, with its equally ludicrous premise centered on a haunted doll), making the smart decision to turn the unintentional camp of Orphan into intentional camp, alongside adding a dose of satire about the corruptive pressures of the nuclear family." Chris Evangelista from SlashFilm wrote: "David Coggeshall's script has more than a few tricks up its sleeve, including some jaw-dropping twists that I will confess I did not see coming. It makes sense—the first film had a jaw-dropping twist too, after all. The twist feels fresh and exciting here, and changes the entire film in a way that's wickedly enjoyable."

Maxance Vincent from Cultured Vultures wrote: "I'll even go out on a limb and say that I had more fun watching Orphan: First Kill than I did the first one, and would highly recommend doing a double feature with both. They're some of the most fascinating horror films from a mainstream studio, and should hopefully reignite Hollywood’s flame to make more horror movies that truly don’t care about the audience's preconceived expectations and throw them off guard the minute they get comfortable. Now that’s cinema, and you cannot convince me otherwise."

In a negative review, Mark Hanson from Slant Magazine gave one out of four stars, writing: "William Brent Bell's film proves that not every horror concept has the potential to be franchised."

Accolades

Possible sequel
In August 2022, when asked about his approach to making the sequel, Bell stated that there would need to be a third film in order for Orphan to be considered a franchise. Later, Fuhrman expressed interest in continuing to portray the character in additional films. Bell later stated that should the prequel prove to be successful, a third film could be developed. The filmmaker expressed interest in exploring a darker third installment that would complete a full story of Leena Klammer / Esther, while stating that there could be multiple sequels: 

Fuhrman confirmed that discussions for a third film, among the creatives and studio are ongoing, stating that there would not be another "13 years this time around" before a sequel is developed.

References

External links
 Orphan: First Kill on Paramount+
 

2022 films
2022 horror films
2020s slasher films
2020s American films
2020s Canadian films
2020s English-language films
2020s psychological horror films
American psychological horror films
Canadian psychological horror films
Dark Castle Entertainment films
Entertainment One films
Films about orphans
Films directed by William Brent Bell
Films scored by Brett Detar
Films set in 2007
Films set in Connecticut
Films set in Estonia
Films set in Moscow
Films shot in Winnipeg
Paramount Players films
American prequel films
Canadian prequel films